Podmelec is a village west of Kneža in the Bača Valley in the Municipality of Tolmin in the Littoral region of Slovenia.

Geography

Podmelec stands on a slope above the right bank of the Bača River.

Church

The parish church in the settlement is dedicated to the Assumption of Mary and belongs to the Koper Diocese.

References

External links

Podmelec on Geopedia

Populated places in the Municipality of Tolmin